Kolosy  is a village in the administrative district of Gmina Czarnocin, within Kazimierza County, Świętokrzyskie Voivodeship, in south-central Poland.

The village has an approximate population of 500.

References

Kolosy